Sky Sports was a South Korea broadcast channel using the operator Skylife TV.

Most recently, the channel was managed by Sky-K, a joint venture between SkyTV and K League Federation.

External links
Official website 

2014 establishments in South Korea
Sports television networks in South Korea
Television channels and stations established in 2014
Television channels in South Korea